Unisławice is a settlement in Gmina Wąsosz, Góra County, Lower Silesian Voivodeship, in south-western Poland.

Between 1975 and 1998, the village was in Leszno Voivodeship.

References

Villages in Góra County